Poyen is a village in the Kargil district, Ladakh, in India, close to the Kargil town. It is on the right bank of Wakha Rong river near its confluence with the Suru River. The village jurisdiction includes the hamlets of Hunderman acquired from Pakistan during the Indo-Pakistan War of 1971.

Demographics
According to the 2011 census of India, Poyen has 29 households. The literacy rate of Poyen is 62.43%. In Hardas, Male literacy stands at 75.27% while the female literacy rate was 50.00%.

Transport

Road
Poyen is well-connected by road to other places in Ladakh and India by the Srinagar-Leh Highway or the NH 1.

Rail
The nearest major railway stations to Hardas are Sopore railway station and Srinagar railway station located at a distance of 218 kilometres and 224 kilometres.

Air
The nearest airport is at Kargil located at a distance of 12 kilometres but it is currently non-operational. The next nearest major airport is Leh Airport located at a distance of 220 kilometres.

See also
Ladakh
Kargil
Dras War Memorial

Notes

References

Villages in Kargil tehsil